Mount Fernie Provincial Park is a provincial park located just west of the town of Fernie in British Columbia, Canada. It was established on May 4, 1959 to protect the ecology of the lower Lizard River while providing recreational opportunities for local residents and visitors alike. The park is named after Mount Fernie, a prominent peak located north of the park.

References

External links

Provincial parks of British Columbia
Parks in the Regional District of East Kootenay
Elk Valley (British Columbia)
1959 establishments in British Columbia
Protected areas established in 1959